Trevor St George Munroe (born 10 December 1944) is a Jamaican political scientist and civil society advocate.

Biography
Born in Kingston, Jamaica, Munroe attended high school at St. George's College (Class of 1959) and later studied political science at the University of the West Indies, Mona. He won a Rhodes Scholarship to the University of Oxford, where he obtained the D.Phil in political science for a landmark study of the process of decolonization in Jamaica between the 1930s and 1960s, published as The Politics of Constitutional Decolonization in 1972.

References

1944 births
Living people
University of the West Indies alumni
Jamaican communists
Jamaican Rhodes Scholars
Members of the Senate of Jamaica
People's National Party (Jamaica) politicians
Workers Party of Jamaica politicians